George Tomlinson (21 March 1890 – 22 September 1952) was a British Labour Party politician.

Biography
George Tomlinson was born at 55 Fielding Street in Rishton, Lancashire, the son of John Tomlinson, a cotton weaver, and his wife Alice, née Varley. He was educated in Rishton at Wesleyan Elementary School.

At the age of 12 he took work as weaver at a cotton mill, working half-time the first year before becoming a full-timer. In 1912 he was elected president of the Rishton district of the Amalgamated Weavers' Association.

Tomlinson married the cotton weaver Ethel Pursell on 4 September 1914 and together they had a daughter.

He was a conscientious objector in the First World War, working on the land for three years.

He was elected Member of Parliament for the Farnworth constituency in Lancashire at a by-election in 1938 and held the seat until his death in 1952, aged 62. He was joint Parliamentary Secretary under Ernest Bevin in the Ministry of Labour and National Service from February 1941 to May 1945 in Winston Churchill's wartime Coalition Government. In Clement Attlee's post-war Labour government he was Minister of Works, August 1945 – February 1947, and Minister of Education, February 1947 – October 1951, following the death of Ellen Wilkinson.

In 1944 Tomlinson was a British delegate at the International Labour Conference held at Philadelphia in the United States.

A biography of Tomlinson written by Fred Blackburn, a fellow Labour politician and Member of Parliament for Stalybridge and Hyde, was published by Heinemann in 1954. The biography, which features a foreword by Clement Attlee, is largely based on talks Blackburn had with Tomlinson before his death.

The George Tomlinson School, which opened in Kearsley the year following his death, was named in his memory. The school converted to academy status in 2010 and was renamed Kearsley Academy.

References

Bibliography

Further reading

External links 
 
 

1890 births
1952 deaths
British Secretaries of State for Education
British conscientious objectors
Labour Party (UK) MPs for English constituencies
Members of the Privy Council of the United Kingdom
Ministers in the Attlee governments, 1945–1951
Ministers in the Churchill wartime government, 1940–1945
People from Rishton
UK MPs 1935–1945
UK MPs 1945–1950
UK MPs 1950–1951
UK MPs 1951–1955
United Textile Factory Workers' Association-sponsored MPs